Alpár "Mesi" Mészáros (born 22 November 1964) is a retired football player, currently a manager.

Club career
Mészáros started his football career at U Cluj. He was transferred to Dinamo București and later, he went abroad to the Hungarian side Volán FC. In 1991 Alpár Mészáros moved to Germany where he played until the end of his career at Rot Weiss Waldorf and Flensburg 08.

Coaching career
Between 2002 and 2005, Mészáros trained SG Altenhaßlau / Eidengesäß from Germany. In 2007, he accepted to train the second division Romanian team ISCT. In January 2008 Alpár Mészáros started to coach the Liga I team, U Cluj. He was dismissed on 20 August 2008.

Personal life
Alpár Mészáros lives in Cluj-Napoca, Romania.

Honours

Player
Universitatea Cluj
Divizia B: 1984–85
Dinamo București
Divizia A: 1989–90

References

External links
Alpár Mészáros's coaching career in Liga I at Labtof.ro

1964 births
Living people
Sportspeople from Cluj-Napoca
Romanian footballers
Association football defenders
Liga I players
Liga II players
FC Universitatea Cluj players
FC Dinamo București players
Romanian expatriate footballers
Expatriate footballers in Germany
Expatriate sportspeople in Germany
Expatriate footballers in Hungary
Expatriate sportspeople in Hungary
Romanian football managers
FC Universitatea Cluj managers
FC Unirea Dej managers